Dibi is a Senegalese and Gambian dish consisting of grilled meat (usually lamb) that has been seasoned and cut into pieces. Dibi is typically served with grilled onions, mustard, and bread. Eateries that serve dibi are called "dibiteries." Dibi is commonly served by street vendors in Senegal. Many dibiteries in Senegal's capital city of Dakar are foreigners, particularly from the Hausa people of Nigeria. "Dibi" is a Wolof word that refers to barbecue.

Dibi is not to be confused with "dibi Hausa", the Senegalese term for suya. Both dibi and dibi suya are cooked on a grill or a wood-burning stove, but dibi isn't sliced thinly like suya is nor is dibi marinated in kankankan spice. Whole lamb can be ordered from some dibiteries and is considered a delicacy. Cooking a whole lamb is referred to as méchoui. Méchoui is a Maghrebi style of cooking introduced to Senegal from Mauritania. Dibi is often served with a side of fried plantains, French fries, or a tomato and lettuce salad.

See also
Barbecue
Kyinkyinga
Senegalese cuisine
Suya

References

Gambian cuisine
Hausa
Lamb dishes
Meat dishes
Nigerian diaspora
Senegalese cuisine
Street food